The California State Indian Museum is a museum in the state park system of California, United States, interpreting the diverse cultures of the indigenous peoples of California.  It is located in Midtown Sacramento at 2618 K Street. The museum exhibits traditional items illustrating the varying cultures of the state's first inhabitants.

The native population of California, one of the largest and most diverse in the Western hemisphere, was made up of over 150 distinct tribal groups who spoke at least 64 different languages. Prior to the arrival of the first European explorers, the native population is estimated to have been in excess of 500,000 people.

General information
The State Indian Museum, opened in 1940, is located at 2618 K Street Sacramento, near the intersection of 26th and K Streets.  Current exhibits depict three major themes of California Indian life: Nature, Spirit, and Family.  Native peoples lived prosperously for thousands of years in what is now California.  All of the exhibits and photographs on display in the museum are presented with respect for those who went before us on this land and continue to live in California communities today.

California Indian cultural items in the museum include traditional baskets (along with some of the smallest in the world), a redwood dugout canoe, ceremonial regalia, beadwork, and hunting & fishing tools—some of which are more than twenty-four hundred years old.  There is also an exhibit depicting the life of Ishi, reputedly the last survivor of the Yahi tribe, illustrating how Native culture was powerfully impacted and forever changed when outsiders arrived.

Many Native people have donated photographs of family and friends for viewing in the museum.  There is also a wall of photographs devoted to honoring California Elders, and a hands-on area where visitors have the opportunity to utilize Indian tools like the pump drill, used for making holes in shell beads, and the mortar & pestle, used for grinding acorns.

See also
List of California state parks
Sutter's Fort
Indigenous peoples of California

References

External links
 California State Indian Museum
 California Indian Heritage Center

1940 establishments in California
California Historical Landmarks
History museums in California
Museums established in 1940
Museums in Sacramento, California
Native American museums in California